Valve No. 10 is an album by the American jazz violinist Billy Bang recorded in 1988 and released on the Italian Soul Note label.

Reception
The Allmusic review by Scott Yanow awarded the album 2½ stars stating "Bang combines a strong technique with a primitive sound and it may take listeners a little while to get used to his tone".

Track listing
All compositions by Billy Bang except as indicated
 "P.M." (Paul Mitchell, Sirone) - 5:45 
 "Valve No. 10" - 9:12 
 "September 23rd" - 5:49 
 "Improvisation for Four" - 4:08 
 "Bien-Hoa Blues" - 4:56 
 "Holiday for Flowers" (William Parker) - 5:28 
 "Lonnie's Lament" (John Coltrane) - 12:16 
Recorded at Barigozzi Studio in Milano, Italy on March 8 & 9, 1988

Personnel
Billy Bang - violin, poetry
Frank Lowe - tenor saxophone
Sirone – bass
Dennis Charles – drums

References

Black Saint/Soul Note albums
Billy Bang albums
1988 albums